Friday Night Tykes was a reality sports documentary television series on the Esquire Network. It was produced by 441 Productions, Texas Crew Productions (TCP) and Electro-Fish Films. It premiered on January 14, 2014, and ran for four seasons. The rights were transferred to USA Network after June 2017 upon Esquire Network's discontinuation. The entire series is also licensed to Peacock.

Premise
Friday Night Tykes dives in the intense world of youth football and follows the teams of the Texas Youth Football Association on and off the field as they vie for playoffs glory. Among the challenges the players (as young as 8) face are extreme training drills, psychotic irresponsible parents, heckling from fans, and balancing on-the-field expectations with living a typical childhood away from the gridiron.

References

External links
 

2014 American television series debuts
2010s American reality television series
American sports television series
English-language television shows
Television series by Universal Television
Television shows set in Texas
2017 American television series endings